Rahul Riji Nair is an Indian film director, scriptwriter and producer active in the Malayalam film industry. His debut feature film Ottamuri Velicham won 4 awards at the 2017 Kerala State Film Awards, including Best Feature Film. Rahul won the 67th National Film Awards for Best Malayalam Film in 2019 for his third feature film Kalla Nottam.

Personal life 
Rahul was born in Kollam, Kerala on 21 March 1988 to Dr. Riji G. Nair and Rajasree Nair. He did his schooling from SN Trusts Central School, Kollam. He graduated in Engineering from Amrita School of Engineering in 2009.

He worked as a Software Engineer and then as Marketing Manager with multiple companies in Technopark, Trivandrum before venturing into filmmaking. He is married to Nithya Vijay.

Career 
Rahul started his career in the Malayalam film industry in 2017 as the writer and director of the Malayalam feature film Ottamuri Velicham. This film won 4 awards in Kerala State Film Awards 2017, including Best Feature Film of the year. His third feature film, Kalla Nottam won the 67th National Film Award for Best Malayalam Feature Film. 

His films have premiered at prestigious film festivals in Mumbai, Kolkata, New York, Stuttgart, Chicago etc. He has also won the prestigious Golden Royal Bengal Tiger Award for Best Feature Film at the  26th Kolkata International Film Festival and German Star of India Award for Best Feature film at the Indian Film Festival of Stuttgart. 

Rahul founded the production house First Print Studios in 2011 and is currently serving the company as its CEO. He ventured into independent filmmaking through documentaries and short films. He first directed the documentary The Human Boundaries in 2012 and it was widely screened across India, Europe and the United States. His short films Troll Life, MJ and Rs 2 have won awards at international filmmaking competitions. His Tamil Music Video titled Mounam Sollum Varthaigal went viral with over 25 million views.

Filmography

Feature films

Web series

As actor

As lyricist

Music Video

Short films

Documentary

Awards

National Film Awards
 2019 - 67th National Film Awards - Best Malayalam Film : Kalla Nottam

Kerala State Film Awards
 2017 - Kerala State Film Award for Best Film : Ottamuri Velicham

Kerala Film Critics Award
 2020 - Special Jury Award : Kho Kho

 International Awards
 2021 - Golden Royal Bengal Tiger Award for Best Feature Film, 26th Kolkata International Film Festival: Kalla Nottam 
2021 - Best Screenplay, Yellowstone International Film Festival: Kalla Nottam 
 2020 - Best Film Innovation Award, Indian Film Festival of Cincinnati: Kalla Nottam
 2018 - German Star of India [Best Feature Film], 15th Indian Film Festival Stuttgart: Ottamuri Velicham
 2018 - Second Best Feature Film, Chicago South Asian Film Festival: Ottamuri Velicham

 Nominations

 2020 - Best Film, Indian Film Festival of Cincinnati: Kalla Nottam
 2020 - Best Screenplay, Indian Film Festival of Cincinnati: Kalla Nottam
 2020 - Best Screenplay,  New York Indian Film Festival: Kalla Nottam
 2018 - Best Film, New York Indian Film Festival: Ottamuri Velicham
 2018 - Best Director, New York Indian Film Festival: Ottamuri Velicham
 2018 - Director's Vision Award, 15th Indian Film Festival Stuttgart: Ottamuri Velicham
 2018 - Oxfam Award for Best Film on Gender Equality, Mumbai Film Festival: Ottamuri Velicham

References

External links

21st-century Indian film directors
Malayalam film directors
Living people
Film directors from Kerala
People from Kollam
1988 births
Indian male screenwriters
Screenwriters from Kerala
Malayalam screenwriters
Malayalam film producers
Indian male film actors
Male actors in Malayalam cinema
Malayalam-language lyricists